Boomerang: Original Soundtrack Album is the soundtrack to Reginald Hudlin's 1992 film Boomerang. It was released on June 30, 1992, by LaFace Records. The album peaked at number four on the US Billboard 200 and reached the top spot on the Top R&B/Hip-Hop Albums chart. The album was certified gold by the Recording Industry Association of America (RIAA) in August 1992 and eventually reached triple-platinum status by April 1995.

Track listing

Notes
  signifies a co-producer

Personnel
Information taken from AllMusic.

Bass – Kayo, Debra Killings
Coordination – Constance Armstrong, Sharliss Ashbury
Drums – L.A. Reid
Executive production – L.A. Reid
Keyboards – Babyface, Bo Watson
Mastering – Chris Gehringer
Music supervision – Bill Stephney
Percussion – L.A. Reid
Performer – Babyface, Boyz II Men, Toni Braxton, Damian Dame, Johnny Gill, Aaron Hall, Highland Place Mobsters, Grace Jones, P.M. Dawn, Shanice, TLC, A Tribe Called Quest, Keith Washington, Charlie Wilson
Piano – Jim Lunarci, Vance Taylor
Production – Dallas Austin, Babyface, Buster, P.M. Dawn, Randy Ran, L.A. Reid, Shavoni, Daryl Simmons, A Tribe Called Quest, Kenny Vaughan
Technical assistance – Donald Parks
Vocals – Babyface, Boo Boo, Boyz II Men, Toni Braxton, Damian Dame, Johnny Gill, Aaron Hall, Grace Jones, LaFace Cartel, Lisa "Left Eye" Lopes, P.M. Dawn, Shanice, T-Boz, A Tribe Called Quest, Kenny Vaughan, Keith Washington
Background vocals – Babyface, Toni Braxton, Deah Dame, Kevon Edmonds, Melvin Edmonds, Debra Killings, Maniac, Keith Michell, Tye-V, Charlie Wilson

Charts

Weekly charts

Year-end charts

Certifications

See also
 List of Billboard number-one R&B albums of 1992

References

1992 soundtrack albums
Albums produced by Babyface (musician)
Albums produced by Dallas Austin
Albums produced by L.A. Reid
Albums produced by Q-Tip (musician)
Comedy film soundtracks
Contemporary R&B soundtracks
Hip hop soundtracks
LaFace Records soundtracks
Romance film soundtracks